Divine Songs Attempted in Easy Language for the Use of Children (also known as Divine and Moral Songs for Children and other similar titles) is a collection of didactic, moral poetry for children by Isaac Watts, first published in 1715. Though Watts's hymns are now better known than these poems, Divine Songs was a ubiquitous children's book for nearly two hundred years, serving as a standard textbook in schools. By the mid-19th century there were more than one thousand editions.

Three of the best-known poems in the collection are "Praise for Creation and Providence", "Against Idleness and Mischief", and "The Sluggard". 
"Praise for Creation and Providence" (better known as "I sing the mighty power of God") is now a hymn sung by all ages. "Against Idleness and Mischief" and "The Sluggard" (better known as "How doth the little busy bee" and "'Tis the voice of the sluggard") were both meant to teach children the importance of hard work, and were extremely well known in the nineteenth century. Walter de la Mare wrote that "a childhood without the busy bee and the sluggard would resemble a hymnal without ‘O God, our help in ages past’." Charles Dickens's novels occasionally quote "Against Idleness and Mischief"; for instance, in his 1850 novel David Copperfield, the school master Dr. Strong quotes lines 11-12: "Satan finds some mischief still, for idle hands to do." In his 1865 fantasy Alice in Wonderland, Lewis Carroll parodies both "Against Idleness and Mischief" as "How Doth the Little Crocodile" and "The Sluggard" as "'Tis the voice of the Lobster".

See also

Hymns for the Amusement of Children by Christopher Smart, 1771
Hymns in Prose for Children by Anna Laetitia Barbauld, 1781
 Hymns for Little Children by Cecil Frances Alexander, 1848

References

Citations
 De la Mare, Walter. Early One Morning in the Spring: Chapters on Children and on Childhood as it is revealed in particular in Early Memories and in Early Writings. New York: Octagon Books, 1977.
 Dickens, Charles. David Copperfield. Ed. Nina Burgis; notes, Andrew Sanders. Oxford: Oxford University Press, 2008.
 Gardner, Martin, ed. The Annotated Alice: The Definitive Edition. New York: Norton, 2000.
 McCune, Adam. "How Doth the Little Crocodile: Moralistic Poetry and Predation in Dickens and Carroll". MA thesis. University of Virginia, 2011.
 Shaw, John MacKay. "Poetry for Children of Two Centuries". Research about nineteenth-century children and books. Urbana-Champaign, Illinois: University of Illinois, 1980. 133-142.
 Stone, Wilbur Macey. The Divine and Moral Songs of Isaac Watts: An Essay thereon and a tentative List of Editions. New York: The Triptych, 1918.

External links
 Download links at Internet Archive

Children's poetry books
1715 poems
18th-century British children's literature
Hymns by Isaac Watts
Religious works for children